Clive Thornton Radley  (born 13 May 1944) is an English former cricketer, who played eight Test matches and four One Day Internationals for England. He was selected as one of the five Wisden Cricketers of the Year in 1979.

County career
Radley represented Norfolk in 8 Minor County matches in 1961 and Middlesex in 62 2nd XI matches (1962–90) and 520 First-class matches for the 1st XI (1964–87), making 46 hundreds, with a best of 200. He also played for Auckland in New Zealand in 1984/85.

Radley was part of a successful Middlesex side which won the County Championship outright in 1976, 1980, 1982  and 1985, and also shared it with Kent in 1977.  He also enjoyed success in one-day tournaments, especially in one-day finals played on his county home ground at Lord’s.  He top-scored for his county in their victories in the final of the 1977 Gillette Cup, the 1983 Benson & Hedges Cup, the 1984 NatWest Trophy, and the 1986 Benson & Hedges Cup, winning the man of the match award in all of these except the latter. He was also part of the Middlesex side which won the 1980 Gillette Cup.

Test career
Radley's batting average in Tests (48.10) was substantially higher than he achieved in all first-class cricket (35.44), despite his not making his Test debut until the comparatively advanced age of thirty-three. Also an acclaimed fieldsman, after years of scurrying accumulation for Middlesex, Mike Brearley's accession to the England captaincy did his international cause no harm. His brief Test career, however, was ended prematurely by a bad blow to the head in the first match on the 1978/79 tour of Australia.  He made two test centuries, his highest score being an innings of 158 against New Zealand which lasted nearly 11 hours, made in Geoff Boycott’s last test as England captain.

One-day international Career
Radley also ended his career with an unusually high average in one-day internationals of 83.33, assisted by the fact that he is one of the few international cricketers to make a century in his last One Day International, an unbeaten 117 against New Zealand in 1978. He was also named both man of the match, and man of the series, in this last appearance. All of his four internationals, like all of his test matches, were played in 1978.

Post-retirement
On his retirement as a player, he served as the 2nd XI coach of Middlesex (1988–90) until his appointment as Marylebone Cricket Club (MCC) head coach in 1991 (in succession to Don Wilson) where he remained until his retirement in 2009. He was appointed Member of the Order of the British Empire (MBE) in the 2008 New Year Honours for services to cricket.

He was elected to serve for a two-year term as the 22nd President of Middlesex County Cricket Club at its 149th Annual General Meeting at Lord's in April 2013 succeeding Geoff Norris.

References

External links

1944 births
Living people
Auckland cricketers
Cricketers from Hertfordshire
D. B. Close's XI cricketers
D. H. Robins' XI cricketers
England One Day International cricketers
England Test cricketers
English cricketers
International Cavaliers cricketers
Marylebone Cricket Club cricketers
Members of the Order of the British Empire
Middlesex cricketers
Norfolk cricketers
People educated at Norwich School
People from Hertford
Presidents of Middlesex County Cricket Club
T. N. Pearce's XI cricketers
Wisden Cricketers of the Year